Serbian singer and rapper Nikolija has released three studio albums and thirty-four singles (including four as a featured artist). She debuted in April 2013 with the single "Ćao zdravo". Her debut album, No.1, was released in October 2016 featuring previously released songs and three new tracks. It was sold in 50,000 copies. In April 2019, Nikolija released her second studio album, Yin & Yang, digitally as well as in an exclusive printing. Yin & Yang produced two singles: the title track and "Nije lako biti ja" featuring Serbian rapper Fox. Her third album Aurora was released digitally on 4 December 2022.

Nikolija has also released over forty music videos, which collectively have accumulated over half a billion views. Her most viewed music video, "Alkohola litar" (2014) with Elitni Odredi and DJ Mlađa, has over seventy four million views, as of November 2022. The music video for "Opasna igra" was declared as the most Serbian viewed video on YouTube in 2015.

Albums

Studio albums

Singles

As lead artist

As featured artist

Videography

External links
 
 Nikolija on Apple Music

References

Discographies of Serbian artists
Pop music discographies
Electronic music discographies
Hip hop discographies